The NAS Chase Field-Building 1001, also known as Administration Building, in Beeville, Texas was built in 1943.  It was listed on the National Register of Historic Places in 1994.

Building 1001 was one of the first buildings completed on the field, in 1943.  It served as the "symbolic heart" of the naval air station until the station closed in 1993.  All commanding officers of the base have been officed there.  It served as an administration building.  It is a two-story H-shaped building with a four-story tower that provides a sweeping view of the area.

It is one of seven buildings on Naval Air Station Chase Field that were listed on the National Register as part of a study of its historic resources.

See also

National Register of Historic Places listings in Bee County, Texas

References

External links

Military facilities on the National Register of Historic Places in Texas
Infrastructure completed in 1943
Bee County, Texas
National Register of Historic Places in Bee County, Texas